Janet Gretchen Osteryoung (March 1, 1939 – September 21, 2021) was an American chemist who was the Director of the Chemistry Division of the National Science Foundation from 1994 to 2001. Her research furthered the development of electroanalysis and especially that of square wave voltammetry. She was elected a Fellow of the American Association for the Advancement of Science in 1984 and awarded the Garvan–Olin Medal in 1987.

Early life and education 
Janet Gretchen Jones was born in Pittsburgh, Pennsylvania and grew up in Vero Beach, Florida. She was an undergraduate student at Swarthmore College, where she was a Merit scholar. Jones was a graduate student at California Institute of Technology, where she worked alongside Fred Anson on ligand bridging in charge transfer reactions. Robert Osteryoung was a Visiting Associate in the Department of Chemistry at Caltech at this same time. After marrying, Janet and Robert Osteryoung both continued to carry out research in the field of electroanalytical chemistry.

Research and career 
Osteryoung was appointed to the faculty at Montana State University in 1967. She moved to Colorado State University a year later, where she worked in the Departments of Civil Engineering and Microbiology. In 1977, Osteryoung moved to the National Science Foundation, where she was the Program Director for Chemical Analysis.

Osteryoung was made Associate Professor at the State University of New York at Buffalo in 1979 and Professor in 1982. In 1985 Osteryoung was awarded a Guggenheim Fellowship and spent a year at the University of Southampton, where she investigated the fundamentals of solid electrodes.

Osteryoung moved to North Carolina State University in 1992, where she served as Head of Department for two years. In 1994, she returned to the National Science Foundation, where she was made Director of the Division of Chemistry. She was the first woman to win the Jacob F. Schoellkopf medal in 1992.

Awards and honors 
 1984 Elected Fellow of the American Association for the Advancement of Science 
 1985 Guggenheim Fellowship
 1986 Honorary Fulbright Fellow
 1987 American Chemical Society Garvan–Olin Medal
 1990 Anachem Award
 1990 Honorary member of Iota Sigma Pi
 1992 Jacob F. Schoellkopf Medal
 1996 American Chemical Society Division of Analytical Chemistry Award in Electrochemistry
 1998 Society for Analytical Chemists of Pittsburgh Analytical Chemistry Award 
 1999  The Society for Electroanalytical Chemistry Charles N. Reilley Award in Electroanalytical Chemistry

Selected publications

Personal life 
Janet Jones was once married to Robert Osteryoung, who was also an award-winning chemist. In April 2010, she married Chris Cobb in Washington, DC. Together, Jones and Cobb established the Comis Foundation, a family philanthropic foundation to benefit children and youth.

References 

1939 births
2021 deaths
American chemists
American women chemists
Electrochemists
Analytical chemists
Fellows of the American Association for the Advancement of Science
American LGBT scientists
California Institute of Technology alumni
Swarthmore College alumni
Scientists from Pittsburgh